Cayo Conuco may refer to:

Pinar_del_Río#Cayo_Conuco, a municipality in Pinar del Rio, Cuba
Caibarién#Cayo_Conuco, a small island located seven kilometres from Caibarién, Cuba